Lascelina cordobensis is a species of snout moth in the genus Lascelina. It was described by Herbert H. Neunzig in 1994 from Córdoba, Mexico, from which its species epithet is derived.

References

Moths described in 1994
Phycitinae